James Robert White is a Baptist theologian, the director of Alpha and Omega Ministries, an evangelical Reformed Baptist Christian apologetics organization based in Phoenix, Arizona and a Christian scholar. He is the author of several books.

Early life and education
White graduated with a BA from Grand Canyon University (formerly known as Grand Canyon College) and an MA from Fuller Theological Seminary. His ThM, Th.D. and D.Min. degrees from Columbia Evangelical Seminary (formerly Faraston Theological Seminary), an unaccredited online school. The legitimacy of White's academic credentials has been questioned.

Career
White served as an elder of Phoenix Reformed Baptist Church in Phoenix, Arizona, from 1998 until 2018.  He became Scholar-in-Residence at Apologia Church in Tempe, Arizona in 2018, and was installed as one of the pastor/elders in 2019.

White is the director of Alpha and Omega Ministries, a Christian apologetics organization based in Phoenix, Arizona. As director of Alpha and Omega Ministries, White also hosts a daily Dividing Line Podcast and radio show on the Alpha and Omega Ministries YouTube Channel. He was also a critical consultant for the Lockman Foundation's New American Standard Bible.

White often engages in public debate, having participated in more than 170 public moderated debates, covering topics such as Calvinism, Roman Catholicism, Islam, Mormonism, Infant baptism the King James Only movement, Jehovah's Witnesses, and atheism. His debate opponents have included scholars such as Bart Ehrman, John Dominic Crossan, Marcus Borg, Robert M. Price, Joe Ventilacion of Iglesia ni Cristo and popularizers such as Dan Barker and John Shelby Spong James White has criticized fundamentalist views and King James Onlyism. He has argued that the King James version has multiple translation errors.

White has written multiple books critical of Roman Catholic theology, including the books; The Roman Catholic Controversy, Mary: Another Redeemer? and The Fatal Flaw.

White supports Creationism.

Personal life
He is married and he and his wife have two children. He also has two grandchildren.

White is a Baptist and a Calvinist.

Selected works

See also
 King James Onlyism
 Protestant opposition to papal supremacy

References

External links
 

Living people
20th-century Calvinist and Reformed theologians
21st-century Calvinist and Reformed theologians
American Calvinist and Reformed theologians
American Christian creationists
American evangelicals
American male non-fiction writers
Baptist writers
Christian and Islamic interfaith dialogue
Christian apologists
Christian critics of Islam
Critics of atheism
Critics of the Catholic Church
Critics of Mormonism
Fuller Theological Seminary alumni
Grand Canyon University alumni
People from Hennepin County, Minnesota
Religious leaders from Phoenix, Arizona
Year of birth missing (living people)